Spiraea trilobata, known as Asian meadowsweet, is a species of flowering plant in the family Rosaceae. It was first formally named in 1771. Spiraea trilobata is native to Asia. It has occasionally naturalized in the United States.

References

trilobata
Flora of Asia
Plants described in 1771
Taxa named by Carl Linnaeus